Linkowo  is a village in the administrative district of Gmina Kętrzyn, within Kętrzyn County, Warmian-Masurian Voivodeship, in northern Poland.

The village has a population of 133.

Notable residents
 Karl von der Gröben (1788–1876), general

References

Linkowo